Kirchheim (Unterfranken) station is a railway station in the municipality of Kirchheim, located in the Würzburg district in Bavaria, Germany.

References

Railway stations in Bavaria
Buildings and structures in Würzburg (district)